București Mall (known locally as Mall Vitan) is a shopping mall located in the Vitan neighborhood of Bucharest, Romania, close to the Dudești and Văcărești neighbourhoods. At the time of its completion it was the first shopping mall in Romania.

Located on Calea Vitan approximately  outside Bucharest's historic center, the four-story,  mall opened in 1999, in a Ceaușescu-era abandoned hunger circus, or giant food warehouse, in an area largely shaped during the Communist period (see Ceaușima).

References

External links

Shopping malls in Bucharest
Shopping malls established in 1999
1999 establishments in Romania